The Escuela de Artes Plásticas y Diseño de Puerto Rico is an institution of higher learning engaged in the training of students in the visual arts.  It is located in Old San Juan, San Juan, Puerto Rico.  The school was founded in 1965 as part of the Institute of Puerto Rican Culture. Painter José Antonio Torres Martinó was one of the school's co-founders. The school's first director was Miguel Pou.

As an autonomous school it was created by an amendment of legislation by the Legislative Assembly of Puerto Rico in 1971, and achieved its definitive form and autonomy under Public Law 54 of August 22, 1990.

The school offers bachelor degrees in seven concentrations: graphic arts, photography and design (with specialties in digital graphic design and photography and motion), art education, sculpture, painting, industrial design and fashion design. Today, the school is Puerto Rico's foremost institution of higher education in the visual arts. The building used to be the Insular Madhouse or Manicomio Insular.

Gallery

References

External links
 

1961 establishments in Puerto Rico
Art schools in Puerto Rico
Government-owned corporations of Puerto Rico
Universities and colleges in Puerto Rico
Educational institutions established in 1971
Historic district contributing properties in Puerto Rico
Old San Juan, Puerto Rico